Pentachondra is a genus of prostrate shrubs in the family Ericaceae. The genus is native to Australia and New Zealand.

Species include:

Pentachondra dehiscens Cherry
Pentachondra ericifolia Hook.f.
Pentachondra involucrata R.Br. 
Pentachondra pumila (J.R.Forst. & G.Forst.) R.Br.

References

Epacridoideae
Ericaceae genera